Healthline Media, Inc. is an American website and provider of health information headquartered in San Francisco, California. It was founded in 1999, relaunched in 2006, and established as a standalone entity in January 2016.

Accuracy
There are questions about the quality and neutrality of their content. One critic noted that a Healthline article about a new medication used promotional language, copied from the drug-maker's press release, neglected to cite side effects, and framed the drug's claimed benefits in misleading language not correctly representing the evidence in a peer-reviewed medical journal.

Other critics have noted:

 headlines that exaggerate the substance of the article;
 inadequate journalistic and scientific skepticism when reporting "news";
 failure to balance quotes from vested interests with quotes from interviews of independent sources;
 reported medical "news" that had not yet been validated by publication in a peer-reviewed journal; 
 implied clinical applicability for developments not yet scientifically validated;
 failure to balance reports of claimed theoretical benefits of a new treatment, with a corresponding report of the associated cost or required frequency of treatment;
 failure to cite sources;
 failure to link to source of studies cited in the article.

In a 2019 interview with AdExchanger.com, Healthline Media CEO David Kopp claimed that his site had received, out of 40,000 comments, "a few hundred" critiques from consumerstriggering changes to "several hundred articles" on Healthline. He further noted that Healthline provided advertisers with ads matched to "content... relevant to the product."

History
Healthline Media was founded in 1999 as YourDoctor.com, by endocrine specialist James Norman. In 2006, the company was re-launched as Healthline Networks.

In 2011, Healthline was losing money as it was licensing its content from others. In response, the company invested $1 million in developing its own content.

By 2013, it had over $21 million in revenue and 105 employees, with offices in New York City and San Francisco. Deloitte ranked Healthline Media as one of the top 500 fastest-growing technology companies in North America from 2010 to 2013.

In January 2016, Healthline raised $95 million in growth equity financing through Summit Partners. Under the terms of the agreement, Healthline's media business was established as a standalone entity with David Kopp as CEO. The firm acquired the health news website Medical News Today and reference website MediLexicon in May 2016.

In July 2019, Healthline was acquired by Red Ventures. In August 2020, Healthline acquired Psych Central.

Healthline.com
Healthline Media's website publishes health and wellness information. In 2010, Healthline Media signed an agreement to provide medical and health-related content to Yahoo! Health. Other partners have included AARP.com, The Dr. Oz Show web site, and Aetna.

References

External links
 

American medical websites
Health care companies established in 1999
Internet properties established in 1999
Companies based in San Francisco
1999 establishments in California
Red Ventures
2019 mergers and acquisitions